Low Blow (released in the Philippines as The Last Fight to Win: The Bloody End) is a 1986 film edited, shot, and directed by Frank Harris and released through Crown International Pictures. It is about a private investigator that goes on the hunt for a girl who has been taken in by a religious cult. He recruits a team to help him in his quest to rescue the girl. It stars Leo Fong, Cameron Mitchell, Troy Donahue, Akosua Busia and Stack Pierce.

Plot
A young heiress is in the clutches of a weird religious sect which is based in a rural compound. The cult leader (played by Cameron Mitchell). At his side is a lady called Karma (played by Akosua Busia) who has a vocal prowess. She is also the lover of the leader. Joe Wong (played by Leo Fong) is a former policeman, who has been hired by her businessman father to bring her back to him safely. He teams up with a group to help him which includes a Vietnam vet and a pro-boxing champ.

Cast

Production
The film was directed by Frank Harris. Leo Fong produced the film and Hope Holiday was the associate producer. Leo Fong also wrote the story. The film also features Billy Blanks in his first film role.

Release
Low Blow was released in the United States in 1986. In the Philippines, the film was released as The Last Fight to Win: The Bloody End by Movierama Films on October 13, 1988, connecting it to the unrelated film Fight to Win; the film poster miscredits Jean-Claude Van Damme as its writer and director.

It was released on Vestron in both Beta and VHS formats in 1986.

Critical reception
Fong's performance in the cult film was called a tour de force head-scratcher by Cnet.com.

It featured on Red Letter Media's "Best of the Worst" web series in 2015.

References

External links

1986 films
1980s action drama films
1986 martial arts films
1986 drama films
American action drama films
American independent films
Crown International Pictures films
Fictional cults
Films directed by Frank Harris
Films shot in California
1980s English-language films
1980s American films